The 2001 Rhein Fire season was the seventh season for the franchise in the NFL Europe League (NFLEL). The team was led by head coach Pete Kuharchek in his first year, and played its home games at Rheinstadion in Düsseldorf, Germany. They finished the regular season in third place with a record of five wins and five losses.

Offseason

Free agent draft

Personnel

Staff

Roster

Schedule

Standings

Game summaries

Week 1: vs Amsterdam Admirals

Notes

References

Rhein
Rhein Fire seasons
Rhein
Rhein